The Abbotsford News is a Canadian community newspaper in Abbotsford, British Columbia published by Black Press. The News publishes more than 40,000 copies two times a week distributed across Abbotsford and also the adjacent municipality of Mission.

The News claims to be one of the first community newspapers in the province due to its roots from the Abbotsford Post established in 1906 by Mission publisher John A. Bates. The Post was sold in 1922 and changed its name to Abbotsford, Sumas and Matsqui News. Other sales to new owners occurred in 1938 and 1962. Black Press purchased The News in 1997.

The News competed against the Abbotsford Times until Black Press purchased the Times from Glacier Media and announced in December 2013 that it would cease publishing the Times due to revenue losses and disinterest in staff at the Times transferring to Black Press. No new publishing has been as of date.

See also
 List of newspapers in Canada

References

External links
 Abbotsford News – Official website

Newspapers established in 1906
Abbotsford, British Columbia
Black Press
Weekly newspapers published in British Columbia
1906 establishments in British Columbia